Flushed is an Australian children's game show, that is produced in Australia by SLR Productions and aired for two seasons from 16 March 2015 to 5 August 2016 on 7two. Starting with the third season on 3 July 2017, the show moved to Seven Network. The host for the first season was Shae Brewster; she was replaced by Candice Dixon starting with the second season.

References 

7two original programming
Seven Network original programming
Australian children's television series
Australian children's game shows
2015 Australian television series debuts
2017 Australian television series endings
2010s Australian game shows